Lucien Gourong (11 October 1943 – 15 February 2021) was a French writer, singer, and storyteller.

Biography
After he earned a degree in history from the University of Nantes, Gourong owned a cabaret in Lorient for ten years, where he programmed over 500 shows. He spent more than 40 years as a storyteller, travelling across France and the Francophone world. His stories included Écoute voir comme ça sent bon, La Mer à boire, Les aventures du Capitaine Morvan, and L'aïeule ! Oh que la guerre est moche. He founded a storytelling festival, which took place in Chevilly-Larue. He participated in the Étonnants voyageurs festival in Saint-Malo.

His father gifted him dozens of notebooks written by a Breton sailor, which were translated into French by Gourong.

Lucien Gourong died from COVID-19, on 15 February 2021, during the COVID-19 pandemic in France. He was 77.

Bibliography
Grande et petites histoires de l’île (1997)
Contes de la rade de Lorient et des Coureaux de Groix (1998)
Contes de Quiberon et des alentours (1999)
L'Aïeule (1999)
Contes des îles de Bretagne (1999)
Tout conte fait (2002)
Les Aventures du capitaine Morvan (2002)
Le Grand Géant Grands Sourcils, Blanc Silex Editions (2002)
Drôles de Marines! (2004)
Saveurs de Bretagne (2005)
Carnet gourmand de Bretagne (2007)
Confidences d'un homard (2008)
A table ! (2019)

Discography
Faut faire avec (1976)
Kloz En Douët - L'Île De Groix & La Mer - Histoires & Chansons (1977)
Venez avec moi au bistrot (1979)
Les temps changent (1981)
Les veillées mortuaires (1982)
Le Yank Tsé Kiang (1983)
De long en large (1992)
Le Vieil Océan (1992)
De l’Orient à Lorient (1992)
La destinée souriante des loups de mer manqués (1999)
Les Sept Vies (2001)
Le Best of (2005)
Le best-of - 2 (2005)

References

External links
 

1943 births
2021 deaths
French writers
French male singers
French storytellers
Deaths from the COVID-19 pandemic in France
People from Morbihan